Jo and the Boy is a 2015 Malayalam film directed by Rojin Thomas. It stars Manju Warrier and Master Sanoop or Sanoop Santhosh in lead roles. Music is by Rahul Subramaniam. The film won two awards at 2015 Kerala State Film Awards. The movie failed at box-office.

Plot
Joanne Mary Jo is interested in animation from childhood. Her dream\aim is to become a well known animator and create an animation character that can interact with its fans. Her attempts to become successful in the animation field fails, but she didn't give it up.  A boy named Criz shifts into the neighbourhood she stays in. She creates an animation character from Crizs mannerisms. The animation character that Joanne had created becomes popular worldwide. But problems start evolving in their friendship.

Cast
 Manju Warrier as Joanne Mary AKA Jo
 Sanoop Santhosh as Criz
 Kiran Aravindakshan as Appan (Jo's Friend)
 Lalu Alex as John Lawrence
 Kalaranjini as Mary John
 Sudheer Karamana as Tiger Bangla
 Pearle Maaney as Neethu (Jo's Friend)
 Rekha as Catherine
 Anil Narayan as CEO
 Rekha Menon as TV host

Reception & Box-office
Jo and the Boy starring Manju Warrier and Master Sanoop in lead roles did not get a strong opening in Kerala Boxoffice. When all other releases got at least decent start at boxoffice, this film failed miserably. After 6 days of run in Kerala it was able to collect 2.88 Crore only. After 14 days of running it has collected around 5.63 Crore with Net 4.15 Crore and 1.15 Crore Share

Songs
Music released by Muzik247

Rights

Satellite Rights : Surya TV

Critical/Audience response

The film got mixed reviews from both critics and audience.

Awards
 2015 Kerala State Film Awards
 Won, Best Choreography - Sreejith
 Won, Best Costume Designer - Nissar

References

External links
 

2015 films
2010s Malayalam-language films